Ciprian Ioan Deac (born 16 February 1986) is a Romanian professional footballer who plays as a winger or an attacking midfielder for Liga I club CFR Cluj.

After starting out at Unirea Dej, he spent most of his professional career at CFR Cluj, where he won thirteen domestic trophies. With seven of these being national championships, Deac is one of the most decorated players of the competition. He also had loan stints at Oțelul Galați and Rapid București in Romania, while abroad he represented Schalke 04 in Germany and Aktobe and Tobol in Kazakhstan.

Deac made his international debut for Romania in March 2010, in a 0–2 friendly loss to Israel. He amassed 26 appearances and one goal, before retiring in 2020.

Club career

Early career / Unirea Dej
Deac played as a youngster for Gloria Bistrița, where he was initially deployed as a striker.

He made his senior debut with Unirea Dej, a lower division team. He spent there two seasons and was already scouted by CFR Cluj, however the club who insisted more was Universitatea Cluj who took him for a trial in the camp from Hungary. He managed to impress, however after spending near two months with "U" Cluj the transfer failed due money problems.

CFR Cluj
Deac was finally signed by CFR Cluj during the 2005–06 season, and made his Liga I debut on 6 August 2006 against Unirea Urziceni in a 4–0 victory. During the 2006–07 season led by coach Cristiano Bergodi, he only made eleven appearances for them finishing third place in the Championship. The highlight of his career began in 2007–08 the team's new coach, was Ioan Andone, formerly of Dinamo București who won both the Championship and the Cup.

Deac was loaned out to Oţelul Galaţi during the 2008 half-season where he made fifteen appearances scoring two goals.

Because of his good performances at Oțelul, Deac was preserved in the CFR Cluj roster for the 2008–09 season. In the first part of the season he made nine appearances. The lack of playing time lead him to consider leaving the club. But with the upcoming new coach Dušan Uhrin, Jr., Deac gave up this plan, receiving assurances that he would be used more. In the 2009–10 season, the team managed to win the league title for the second time in its history, the coach being Andrea Mandorlini who said "Deac has grown into an incredible manner, quantitatively and qualitatively". In the 2010 Super Cup match Deac helped the team prevent a defeat, pushing the game into the penalty shootout. After the match, he was chosen as Man of the match.

Schalke 04
On 27 August 2010, Deac signed for the German club Schalke 04 on a three-year contract. The reported transfer fee was €3 million. He made his debut for Die Königsblauen on 14 September, in a Champions League game against Olympique Lyonnais. He only played in the first half, and had a poor performance. He had a very sporadic season in Germany, only appearing in six games, and not putting in very convincing performances.

In the summer of 2011, Deac was loaned to Liga I team, Rapid București for the 2011–12 campaign. Schalke hoped he would regain his form that brought him to the international level.

On 20 December, he scored two goals against FC Vaslui. Although he was sent off, his team won the game with a 3–2 victory, with Nicolae Grigore scoring the winning goal in extratime. On 7 April 2012, Deac scored a goal in the 5–0 thrashing of CFR Cluj.

Return to CFR Cluj
On 30 May 2012, Deac returned to CFR Cluj, where he signed a contract for three years.

Kazakhstan
On 23 June 2015, Deac signed a two-and-a-half-year contract with Kazakhstan Premier League side FC Aktobe. Following the conclusion of the 2015 season, Deac was transfer listed by Aktobe.

Third spell at CFR Cluj
Deac once again returned to CFR Cluj in January 2017. He played 15 matches and netted six goals in the remainder of the season, his good display drawing interest from fellow league team FC Steaua București.

He nevertheless chose to stay with the Alb-vișinii and was offered the number 10 shirt ahead of the 2017–18 campaign. He recorded his first goal of the season in a 1–0 away win over Concordia Chiajna on 17 September 2017. Deac contributed with five goals and eleven assists, with the side claiming the fourth national championship in its history.

International career
Deac made his debut for the Romania under-21 team on 1 June 2007, in a 1–1 draw against France. He was selected by manager Victor Pițurcă for Romania's preliminary squad to play at the UEFA Euro 2008, but eventually missed out on the final list. On 5 March 2010, Deac finally earned his first cap for the seniors in a 0–2 friendly match loss to Israel in Timișoara.

In August 2017, following a six-year absence, he was called up by Christoph Daum for the 2018 FIFA World Cup qualifying matches against Armenia and Montenegro. Deac scored his first goal for the national team in a 1–1 draw with Denmark, on 8 October 2017.

Career statistics

Club

International

Scores and results list Romania's goal tally first, score column indicates score after each Deac goal.

Honours
CFR Cluj
Liga I: 2007–08, 2009–10, 2017–18, 2018–19, 2019–20, 2020–21, 2021–22
Cupa României: 2008–09, 2009–10; runner-up: 2012–13
Supercupa României: 2009, 2010, 2018, 2020; runner-up: 2012, 2021, 2022

Schalke 04
DFB-Pokal: 2010–11

Rapid București
Cupa României runner-up: 2011–12

Individual
Gazeta Sporturilor Romanian Footballer of the Year runner-up: 2020
Liga I Team of the Season: 2019–20, 2020–21,  2021–22

DigiSport Liga I Player of the Month: March 2017

References

External links

1986 births
Living people
People from Dej
Romanian footballers
Association football midfielders
FC Unirea Dej players
Liga I players
Liga II players
CFR Cluj players
ASC Oțelul Galați players
Bundesliga players
FC Schalke 04 players
FC Rapid București players
Kazakhstan Premier League players
FC Aktobe players
FC Tobol players
Romania under-21 international footballers
Romania international footballers
Romanian expatriate footballers
Expatriate footballers in Germany
Romanian expatriate sportspeople in Germany
Expatriate footballers in Kazakhstan
Romanian expatriate sportspeople in Kazakhstan